Michael Trujillo (?-1989), also referred to as Miguel Trujillo, was instrumental to the  case Trujillo v. Garley in 1948; before the case, New Mexico, like many other states, had a ruling that "Indians not taxed" were not legally allowed to vote. With the case Miguel successfully challenged this ruling.

Early life 
Trujillo grew up at Isleta Pueblo. His mother, Juanita Jaramillo Trujillo, was widowed when he was young. She was left on her own to raise Miguel and her other son, Bartolo. Despite his family's pleas for him to drop out of school and return to the pueblo to help his family, Miguel attended the Albuquerque Indian School and then the Haskell Institute in Lawrence, Kan. Eventually, he earned a bachelor's degree from the University of New Mexico.

He went on to serve in the US Marines during World War II.

Family 
Miguel Trujillo married to Ruchanda Paisano and had two children who went into the field of medicine, a daughter, Josephine Waconda, and a son, Dr. Michael Trujillo, the director of the Indian Health Service under President Bill Clinton.

Native American vote in New Mexico 
Prior to 1948, Native Americans living in New Mexico were disenfranchised. It was until after World War II that the returning veteran Miguel Trujillo started a legal and political campaign to advocate for the voice of Native Americans until those rights were extended. Miguel, after returning as a Marine after the war, confronted the harsh reality that although he was a citizen and veteran, he was not allowed to vote in the country in which he had served. Miguel was turned down by the county registrar Eloy Garley when he tried to register. Miguel sued him in the court case of Trujillo v. Garley, decided by a three-judge panel in Albuquerque. At the time, New Mexico, like many other states, had a ruling that "Indians not taxed' were not legally allowed to vote. The case successfully challenged this ruling.

See also
Harrison v. Laveen

References 

Year of birth missing
1989 deaths
Native Americans' rights activists
Pueblo people
Educators from New Mexico
20th-century Native Americans